Alfonso Arau Incháustegui (born 11 January 1932) is a Mexican filmmaker, actor, and singer. He worked as an actor and director in both Mexican and Hollywood productions for over 40 years, before his international breakthrough with the 1992 film Like Water for Chocolate, based on his wife Laura Esquivel's novel of the same name. His other films include A Walk in the Clouds (1995), Picking Up the Pieces (2000), The Magnificent Ambersons (2002), and Zapata: El sueño del héroe (2004). He is a five-time Ariel Award winner, including Best Director for Like Water for Chocolate, and a BAFTA nominee.

Life and career 
The son of a physician, Arau was born in Mexico City. He directed the films Zapata: The Dream of a Hero, Like Water for Chocolate (adapted from the novel written by his ex-wife Laura Esquivel), A Walk in the Clouds with Keanu Reeves and Anthony Quinn, and the Hallmark Hall of Fame production A Painted House (adapted from the John Grisham novel of the same name). Among a plethora of roles in his career, Arau played "Captain Herrera", a lieutenant of Federal general "Mapache", in Sam Peckinpah's 1969 western The Wild Bunch,  chief bandit "El Guapo" in Three Amigos (USA, 1986), a comedy with Martin Short, Steve Martin, and Chevy Chase, shady businessman Manuel in the comedy Used Cars (USA, 1980), and the smuggler "Juan" in Romancing the Stone (USA, 1984) starring Michael Douglas and Kathleen Turner. Arau appeared in the 1972 Mexican film El rincón de las vírgenes ("The Virgins' Corner"), where he played the assistant of a fake mystical doctor traveling from town to town, who reminisce about their travels, when a group of women decide to propose the doctor for sainthood. The movie was set in 1920s rural Mexico.

Arau has made many appearances as a character actor in American and TV series and plays. In the 1972 episode of Gunsmoke titled "Hidalgo", Arau portrayed the bandit "Mando" who shoots and wounds marshal Matt Dillon.

In 1973, Arau acted in and directed Calzónzin Inspector ("Cazonci" or "Caltzontzin" was the term used in the Purépecha culture, to name their emperors), a movie based on a character from the Mexican comic Los Supermachos of Rius, a cartoonist, who co-wrote the screenplay. The movie, which is influenced by Nikolai Gogol's The Government Inspector, centers around two Mexicans who are mistaken for government inspectors from Mexico City by the corrupt mayor of a small town. It is a humorous political critique, aimed squarely at the then ruling party Partido Revolucionario Institucional (PRI) and its paramilitary caciques, at a time when freedom of speech in politics was highly restricted. There are at least two versions of the movie, with one having some scenes deleted by State censors, the most notable of which depicts the killing of a renegade farmer by a police officer, who shoots the farmer in the back.

In December 2004, the Santa Fe Film Festival honored Alfonso Arau for his work in cinema.

In 2010 he directed the Italian-language film, The Trick in the Sheet.

In January 2011, he starred in Chad, Matt & Rob's "The Treasure Hunt: An Interactive Adventure."

In February 2017, it was alleged by Debra Messing that Arau belittled her for her appearance and body in her first film "A Walk in the Clouds". Arau later denied the allegation.

Filmography
 1954 Looks that Kill as Bailarín (uncredited)
 1954 El casto Susano as (uncredited)
 1956 Caras nuevas
 1957 La locura del rock 'n roll as Cristobal
 1957 Cien muchachas
 1958 Viaje a la luna as Carlos Vera
 1958 Música en la noche
 1960 Los pistolocos
 1962 … und deine Liebe auch as Alfredo
 1965 En este pueblo no hay ladrones as Agente Viajero
 1967 Pedro Páramo as Saltaperico
 1967 The Jungle Book (voice actor, Latin Spanish dub) as Kaa
 1968 Operación carambola as Roman Ayala
 1969 The Wild Bunch as Lieutenant Herrera
 1969 El aviso inoportuno as Cliente Señorito Del Sastre
 1970 Tres amigos
 1970 Jóvenes de la Zona Rosa
 1970 La vida inútil de Pito Pérez
 1970 Paraíso as "El Perro"
 1970 El Topo as Bandido #1
 1971 Scandalous John as Paco
 1971 El águila descalza (director, writer) as Poncho / Jonathan Eaglepass / Mascalzzone
 1971 The Garden of Aunt Isabel
 1972 Gunsmoke (TV Series) as Mando
 1972 Bonanza (TV Series) as Simon
 1972 Run, Cougar, Run as Etio
 1972 El rincón de las vírgenes as Lucas Lucatero
 1974 Calzonzin Inspector (director, writer) as Calzonzín
 1975 Posse as Pepe
 1975 Tívoli (writer) as Tiliches
 1976 La palomilla al rescate as (uncredited)
 1976 Caribe, estrella y aguila (director)
 1980 Used Cars as Manuel
 1981 Mojado Power (director, writer) as Nato Solís
 1982 El día que murió Pedro Infante
 1984 Romancing the Stone as Juan
 1986 Redondo
 1986 Three Amigos as "El Guapo"
 1986 Chido Guan, el tacos de oro (director, writer)
 1987 Miami Vice (TV Series) as Jorge Cruz
 1987 Walker as Raousset
 1988 227 (TV Series) as Alfonso Gonzales
 1991 Camino largo a Tijuana
 1992 Polvora en la piel
 1992 Like Water for Chocolate (director)
 1995 A Walk in the Clouds (director)
 2000 Committed as Grampy
 2000 Picking Up the Pieces (director) as Dr. Amado
 2002 The Magnificent Ambersons (TV, director)
 2003 A Painted House (TV, director)
 2004 Zapata: El sueño de un héroe (director, writer)
 2007 El Muerto as Tezcatlipoca (voice)
 2010 The Trick in the Sheet (director, with Anne Parillaud)
 2012 I Heart Shakey as Raoul
 2017 Coco as Papá Julio (voice)

References

External links
 
 
 Santa Fe Film Festival

1932 births
20th-century Mexican male actors
20th-century Mexican screenwriters
20th-century Mexican male writers
21st-century Mexican male actors
21st-century Mexican screenwriters
Ariel Award winners
Best Director Ariel Award winners
Living people
Male actors from Mexico City
Mexican male film actors
Mexican filmmakers
Mexican film directors
Mexican film producers
Mexican male screenwriters
Writers from Mexico City
Mexican expatriates in the United States